Antonina Girycz (20 February 1939 – 19 January 2022) was a Polish actress. She appeared in more than 50 films and television shows since 1966. Girycz died on 19 January 2022, at the age of 82.

Selected filmography
 Katastrofa (1965)
 A Woman's Decision (1975)

References

External links
 

1939 births
2022 deaths
People from Berdychiv
Polish film actresses
Polish stage actresses
Polish television actresses
Polish voice actresses